Acanthosquilla melissae is a species of stomatopod crustacean in the Nannosquillidae family, and was first described by the Australian carcinologist Shane T. Ahyong in 2007.

In Australia it has been found in the IMCRA regions of the Northwest Shelf Province (Western Australia), Northeast Shelf Transition (Queensland), in the sub-tidal zone.

References

Stomatopoda
Taxa named by Shane T. Ahyong
Crustaceans described in 2007